The Boise Hare Krishna Temple and Vedic Cultural Center was opened near Boise State University, Boise, Idaho, United States, in 1986 in the home of one of the members. Before then there was no Hare Krishna temple in town. Teachers and professors from local schools and colleges often brought classes to the old temple.

In 1999 a new temple was erected between two brick duplexes. The completed temple was opened in August 1999 with Boise Mayor Brent Coles cutting the ribbon to signify the public opening. Except for a gold dome, the brick exterior of the temple blends in with the duplexes and the neighborhood. Inside, the eastern influence is evident.

The temple was designed by Boise architect Bruce Poe. The golden dome, painted ceiling and rich stained glass windows were all crafted by local master artists. Centrally located in the temple is a hand carved teakwood altar from India's Jaipur, and is considered by adherents to be the abode of the presiding temple Deities, Sri Sri Radha-Bankebihari. On the south side of the temple is a stained glass window created by Meridian artist Michael Booth which highlight the "Ten Incarnations."

References

External links
ISKCON Boise Hare Krisna Temple and Vedic Cultural Center
International Society for Krishna Consciousness

Buildings and structures in Boise, Idaho
Hindu temples in Idaho
Krishna temples
Religious organizations established in 1986
1986 establishments in Idaho
Buildings and structures in Ada County, Idaho
Indian-American culture in Idaho
Asian-American culture in Idaho